Sitana dharwarensis is a species of agamid lizard. It is endemic to India.

References

Sitana
Reptiles of India
Reptiles described in 2020